The Prometheus Institute is a 501(c)(3) non-profit public policy organization founded in 2003. The organization is "dedicated to discovering independent policy solutions to pressing national issues, and creatively marketing these ideas to the people of the United States, especially the younger generations." Current projects include:

 DIY Democracy, a free application for the iPhone, iPod Touch, and iPad, which "allows users to communicate directly with leaders at local, state and federal levels of government" instantly and conveniently.
 People for the American Dream, a project designed to inspire young entrepreneurs
 StateHouseCall.org, a blog devoted to decentralized health care solutions

References

External links 
 The Prometheus Institute official site
 Organizational Profile – National Center for Charitable Statistics (Urban Institute)

501(c)(3) organizations
Organizations established in 2003
Public policy research